Lemon Souffle (22 February 1991–8 October 2001) was a European champion Thoroughbred racehorse, bred and trained in the United Kingdom. In the International Classification for 1993 she was the highest-rated two-year-old filly in Europe and was named European Champion Two-Year-Old Filly at the Cartier Racing Awards. In her championship year she won four of her five races including Cherry Hinton Stakes and the Moyglare Stud Stakes. She was also successful at three, winning the Falmouth Stakes. Lemon Souffle was kept in training at four but did not appear on the racecourse and was retired to stud. She was later sold to be a broodmare in Japan.

Background
Lemon Souffle was sired by Salse, a grandson of Northern Dancer, out of the Busted mare Melodrama. She was bred by her owner, Lord Carnarvon at the Highclere Stud in Berkshire from a family which had been in his ownership for many generations.

Salse, the winner of the Prix de la Forêt in 1988, became a successful stallion, siring the winners of over three hundred races including eleven at Group One level. Although he showed his best form over seven furlongs, Salse was capable of producing horses who stayed much further, including Classic Cliche (St Leger, Gold Cup), Luso (Hong Kong Vase) and Timboroa (Turf Classic) as well as faster horses like Air Express (Queen Elizabeth II Stakes) and Lemon Souffle herself. Lemon Souffle's dam, Melodrama, won two races and also produced Caramba (by Belmez), winner of the Nassau Stakes and the Falmouth Stakes.

Lord Carnarvon reportedly named the filly after lemon soufflé, one of his wife's favourite recipes. Lemon Souffle was a temperamental filly: Lord Carnarvon described her as "a lively lady", while her trainer, commenting on the difficulty of administering medical treatment, said that "you wouldn't get near her with a needle, she'd kill you."

She was trained at ages two and three by Richard Hannon Sr. and was ridden all her races by Lester Piggott, who was approaching the end of his career and obtaining fewer rides on top-class horses.

Racing career

1993: two-year-old season

Lemon Souffle never ran in a maiden race, instead making her debut against more experienced fillies in a race at Windsor in April. She was always close to the pace and went clear in the closing stages to win by two and a half lengths. At Newbury in June she faced two winning colts in a three-runner stakes race. Piggott settled her in second before taking the lead two furlongs out. She immediately went clear and pulled away to win by six lengths.

A month later, she was moved up to Group Three class for the Cherry Hinton Stakes at Newmarket. Lemon Souffle started 5/4 favourite, despite looking unimpressive before the race, and won "readily" by one and a half lengths. The Independent called it "the best performance by a two-year-old this season" while Hannon claimed that the filly could "quicken as well as anything we've ever seen". The form of the race however was not particularly strong: none of her seven rivals ever won a Group race. After the race the bookmakers offered her at odds of 14/1 for the following year's 1000 Guineas.

On her next start, Lemon Souffle was sent to Ireland for the Group One Moyglare Stud Stakes over seven furlongs at the Curragh, after being forced to miss the Lowther Stakes with a minor injury. Piggott held the filly up in the early stages before challenging in the straight. Lemon Souffle showed good acceleration to take the lead a furlong out and then pulled away to win by four lengths from the André Fabre-trained Spain Lane.

On her last start of the year, Lemon Souffle was sent to Newmarket for the Group One Cheveley Park Stakes for which she was made odds-on favourite. Her main danger was expected to come from her stable companion Risky, the winner of the Queen Mary Stakes and the Molecomb Stakes, who started at 7/2. Risky took the lead tracked by Piggott on Lemon Souffle. When she was asked to quicken however, Lemon Souffle could make no impression on her stable-mate. The outsider Prophecy came from well off the pace to catch Risky near the finish, with Lemon Souffle two lengths back in third. There was a legitimate excuse for her performance, as she was struck into during the race and came back with a badly gashed hind leg. She had suffered damage to the tendons in her leg, but her racing career was saved after intensive veterinary treatment.

1994: three-year-old season
As a three-year-old, Lemon Souffle was trained for the 1000 Guineas, for which she was favourite. She took time to recover from her injury however, and her progress was delayed by the cold, wet spring. A week before the race, Hannon announced that she would not run as he had been unable to get her into top condition.

She did not appear until the Royal Ascot meeting in June. In the Coronation Stakes she started at 8/1 and ran on steadily in the straight to finish fourth to Kissing Cousin. In July she was made favourite for the Falmouth Stakes, then a Group Two race, at Newmarket. Piggott moved her into the lead two furlongs out and she ran on strongly to win "comfortably" by one and a quarter lengths. Hannon paid tribute to the filly's recuperation, saying that "to come back from what she's been through is unbelievable."

She was then off the racecourse for three months, missing intended runs in the Prix Jacques Le Marois and the Queen Elizabeth II Stakes, after problems in training. On her final start she ran unplaced in the Prix de la Forêt at Longchamp in October.

1995: four-year-old season
According to the Racing Post Lemon Souffle became the property of Susan Magnier and was sent to Ireland to be trained by Dermot Weld in March or April 1995. She did not run for her new connections and was retired to stud.

Race record

Assessment
In the International Classification for 1993 Lemon Souffle was given a rating of 118, making her officially the best filly in Europe, two pounds behind the top-rated colt Grand Lodge.

At the Cartier Racing Awards in November 1993, Lemon Souffle was awarded the title of European Champion Two-Year-Old Filly.

Breeding record
At stud Lemon Souffle produced three minor winners: Ostrovsky (by Thunder Gulch), Bois de Citron (by Woodman) and Dolce Limone (by Sunday Silence). She died in Japan on 8 October 2001.

Pedigree

References

1991 racehorse births
2001 racehorse deaths
Racehorses bred in the United Kingdom
Racehorses trained in the United Kingdom
Cartier Award winners
Thoroughbred family 1-e